Johnstown, historically known as Coorthafooka, is a small town in County Kilkenny, Ireland. Bypassed in December 2008 by the M8, the town lies at the junction of the R639, the R502 and the R435 regional roads. It is the home of the Fenians GAA hurling club.

The village of Johnstown was once part of the barony of Galmoy and was laid out in the early 1700s by the Hely family of Foulkscourt Castle. The Hely family were descended from Sir John Hely  (died 1701), Chief Justice of the Irish Common Pleas.

Public transport
Route 828 operated by M & A Coaches on behalf of the National Transport Authority provides a daily journey each way to/from Cullohill, Durrow (Laois), Abbeyleix and Portlaoise. There is no Sunday service. Bus Éireann's Expressway service between Dublin and Cork ceased to serve Johnstown on 30 June 2012.

Places of interest
Ballyspellan Spa Well is a nearby mineral spa which was visited by Jonathan Swift in 1728. A poem praising its medicinal qualities was penned by Thomas Sheridan and a retort was produced by Swift. In 1806, a Viking Age brooch was found in Ballyspellan and is now on display in the National Museum of Ireland.

It is associated with St Ciarán of Saigir and was attacked by the Vikings in 865.

Foulkscourt Castle, is a Norman-era tower house northwest of the village.

People

J.J Delaney, hurler
Pat Delaney, hurler
P.J. Delaney, hurler
Billy Fitzpatrick, hurler
Sir John Hely,  judge and landowner
Ger Henderson, hurler
John Henderson, hurler and inter-county manager
Pat Henderson, hurler and inter-county manager
Ethel Colburn Mayne, writer
Nicky Orr, hurler
P.J. Ryan, hurler
Ronan Tynan, tenor and 1984 & 1988 Paralympic athlete

See also
 List of towns and villages in Ireland

Further reading

References

External links

Fertagh Parish
Diocese of Ossory
Fenians GAA
Edward Law - Kilkenny History - Miscellaneous Houses

Towns and villages in County Kilkenny
Census towns in County Kilkenny